Stenungsund Municipality (Stenungsunds kommun) is a municipality in Västra Götaland County in western Sweden. Its seat is located in the town of Stenungsund.  The municipality is situated by the sea inside the islands Orust and Tjörn and traversed by the European route E6 and Bohus Line, in which it has three stops (Stora Höga, Stenungsund and Svenshögen).

The municipality was formed through amalgamation in 1952. In 1971 a parish from a dissolved municipality was added.

The coat of arms was registered in 1977.  The device in the upper half is a hydrocarbon molecule, which alludes to the petrochemical industry in the municipality.

Localities (urban areas)

Aröd och Timmervik (also in Kungälv Municipality)
Hallerna 
Jörlanda
Starrkärr och Näs 
Stenungsund (seat)
Stenungsön 
Stora Höga 
Strandnorum
Svenshögen 
Ucklum 
Ödsmål  

Smaller localities (villages):

Gilltorp 
Groland 
Grössbyn 
Härgusseröd 
Kullen och Dyrtorp (biggest village)
Kyrkenorum
Källsby 
Nolgärde och Johannesberg 
Rödmyren och Röd 
Sandbacka
Skotthed 
Spekeröd 
Svartehallen 
Talbo och Östra Skår 
Vulseröd 

The seat is located right by the European route E6 highway and the railway Bohus Line, Bohusbanan.

In 2006, archaeological excavations in the area revealed a series of burial sites dating between 1 AD and 300 AD.

Notable corporations
Hogia (Official website), one of Sweden's largest native computer software developers

Since the 1950s, Stenungsund Municipality has become the center for the petrochemical industry. Its distinguished silhouette is four giant chimneys, belonging to a large power plant.

Sports
The following sports clubs are located in Stenungsund Municipality:
 Stenungsunds IF
 Vallens IF 
 Stss, Tjörn Runt
 Stenungsund HF
 Stenungsunds FC

See also
Stenungsund excavations

References

External links

Stenungsund Municipality - Official site

Municipalities of Västra Götaland County
Metropolitan Gothenburg
Gothenburg and Bohus

nn:Stenungsund